Wedgefield may refer to:

Wedgefield, Western Australia, an industrial area
Wedgefield, Florida, United States
Wedgefield, South Carolina, United States
Wedgefield (CDP), South Carolina, United States